Sipsey Fork may refer to one of the following:
Sipsey Fork, Mississippi
Sipsey Fork of the Black Warrior River

See also
Sipsey Creek (disambiguation)
Sipsey (disambiguation)